John 'Beetle' Bailey is a Canadian freelance recording engineer, mixer, and producer. He has worked with such musicians as The Headstones, Tom Cochrane, Haywire, Triumph, Love Inc. Serena Ryder, Molly Johnson and Monkey House: {two albums: Headquarters (2012) & Left (2016)} and Alex Cuba.

List of award nominations

Juno Awards 
John 'Beetle' Bailey has been nominated eight times for the Juno Award for Recording Engineer of the Year, and has earned two wins.

2007 -  nominated for, and won, the Juno Award for Recording Engineer of the Year, for his work on two songs: "Rain" by Molly Johnson from the album Messin' Around and "Sisters Of Mercy" by Serena Ryder from the album If Your Memory Serves You Well.

2008 - nominated for "Something In The Air Between Us" by Sophie Milman from the album Make Someone Happy and "I'm On Fire" by Harry Manx and Kevin Breit."

2009 - nominated for the songs "Lucky" and "If I Were A Bell" by Molly Johnson from the album Lucky.

2010 - nominated for "I Can't Make You Love Me" by Sophie Milman from the album Take Love Easy and "Havana City" by Hilario Duran Trio

2015 - nominated for "Any Day Now"  by The Breithaupt Brothers from the album Just Passing Through: The Breithaupt Brothers Songbook, Vol. II, and  "Fine and Mellow" by Molly Johnson from her album Because of Billie.

2020 - nominated for, and won, The Juno Award for Recording Engineer of the Year, for his work on two songs:  "Dividido" by Alex Cuba from the album Sublime; and "Shotgun" by Monkey House from the album Friday.

2021 - nominated for "The End Of The Love Affair" by Micah Barnes from the album Vegas Breeze; and "The Grand Bazaar (featuring Bela Fleck and Robi Botos)" from the album REFUGE  by Sultans Of String.

2022 - nominated for "Maybe This Year" by Molly Johnson from the album It's A Snow Globe World;  and "Mi Santuario" by Sultans Of String from the album Sanctuary.

Canadian Folk Music Awards 
2018 - Canadian Folk Music Awards, nominated for Producer of the Year with co-producer Chris McKhool for the album Christmas Caravan by Sultans Of String.

2021 - Canadian Folk Music Awards, won Producer of the Year with co-producer Chris McKhool for the album REFUGE  by Sultans Of String.

Latin Grammy Awards 
2020 - Nomination - Best Engineered Album - SUBLIME by Alex Cuba - John "Beetle" Bailey, engineer; John "Beetle" Bailey, mixer; Harry Hess, mastering engineer

References

External links
 Official Website of John Beetle Bailey

Canadian audio engineers
Canadian Folk Music Award winners
Canadian record producers
Juno Award for Recording Engineer of the Year winners
Living people
Place of birth missing (living people)
Year of birth missing (living people)